The Kyle of Tongue Bridge is part of the Kyle of Tongue Causeway, which crosses Kyle of Tongue sea loch on the north coast of Scotland.

The bridge and causeway were built by Sir Alexander Gibb & Partners in 1971 to carry the A838, the road from Thurso to Durness, across the loch. The  bridge is at the western end of the causeway and it has eighteen spans supported by twin piers. The bridge was fully refurbished in 2011.

References

Bridges completed in 1971
Bridges in Highland (council area)
Concrete bridges in the United Kingdom
Road bridges in Scotland
Buildings and structures in Sutherland
1971 establishments in Scotland